USS YP-152 was a converted fishing vessel which served as an auxiliary patrol boat in the U.S. Navy during World War II.

History
She was laid down as seiner at the Tacoma shipyard of Western Boat Building Company, completed in 1936, and named Western Traveler. On 18 December 1941, she was acquired by the U.S. Navy, designated as a Yard Patrol Craft (YP), and assigned to the 13th Naval District. She was one of the initial ships assigned to the Ralph C. Parker's Alaskan Sector of the 13th Naval District colloquially known as the "Alaskan Navy".

In 1946, she was returned to her former owners. In 1961, she was involved in a collision and sunk in the Grenville Channel off the coast of British Columbia.

References

Auxiliary ships of the United States Navy
Ships built in Tacoma, Washington
1936 ships
Ships built by the Western Boat Building Company
Yard patrol boats of the United States Navy
Ships of the Aleutian Islands campaign